Dale Carrick (born 7 January 1994)  is a Scottish professional footballer, who plays as a striker for Stirling Albion. Carrick started his career with Heart of Midlothian, and has played for Raith Rovers, Kilmarnock, Livingston, Cowdenbeath and Airdrieonians. Carrick has represented Scotland at both under-16 and under-21 levels.

Career
Born in Edinburgh, Carrick grew up supporting Hibs. A member of Hearts Under-20 team  Carrick made his Scottish Premier League debut on 4 August 2012 in a 2–0 win versus St Johnstone. On 23 August 2012 in only his second appearance, Carrick made his European debut as a substitute in a 1–0 defeat versus Liverpool at Tynecastle. Carrick's first goal for the Jambos arrived on 18 January 2014 in a thrilling 3–3 draw versus the Perth club at McDiarmid Park.

Carrick had joined Raith Rovers on 30 January 2015 on a one-month loan deal. The loan deal was then cut-short on 11 February 2015 as a result of Carrick suffering an injury.

On 8 July 2015, Carrick departed the Tynecastle club to pursue regular first-team football elsewhere with his contract terminated by mutual consent. Carrick then signed a three-year contract with Kilmarnock.

After one season with Killie Carrick then signed for the West Lothian club Livingston in July 2016. On 26 January 2017 Carrick moved on loan to Scottish League Two club Cowdenbeath for the remainder of the 2016-17 season. Carrick departed the Lions in January 2018 and signed for Airdrieonians in an attempt to get more first-team football. He remained at Airdrie until May 2021. 

On 28 May 2021, Carrick signed for Scottish League Two side Stirling Albion.

Scotland
Carrick has represented Scotland at under-16 level. Carrick made his debut in an International Challenge match versus Jersey on 18 August 2009 and made four appearances in total.

Career statistics

Honours
Heart of Midlothian

Scottish League Cup:
Runner–up (1): 2013
Scottish Championship:
Winner (1): 2014–15

References

1994 births
Living people
Scottish footballers
Scotland youth international footballers
Association football forwards
Heart of Midlothian F.C. players
Raith Rovers F.C. players
Kilmarnock F.C. players
Livingston F.C. players
Cowdenbeath F.C. players
Airdrieonians F.C. players
Scottish Premier League players
Scottish Professional Football League players
Scotland under-21 international footballers

External links
 

 
Stirling Albion F.C. players
People educated at Boroughmuir High School